Rico Dashon Ramos (born June 20, 1987) is an American professional boxer of Puerto Rican descent. He is a former WBA world super bantamweight champion.

Amateur career
Ramos began boxing when he was 8 years old at South LA's Broadway Boxing Gym. During his amateur career he was an Olympic alternate and won the 2007 National PAL championship. In November 2008, Ramos asked Darnell Walker to train him after he suffered a severe hand injury. While Ramos was under Walker's instruction, he went undefeated, capturing the WBO/NABO Title by defeating Alejandro Pérez.

In 2007 he also was the runner up at the U.S. National Championships, losing to U.S. Olympian Raynell Williams.

Professional career
Currently Ramos is promoted by Goossen Tutor Promotions and managed by Al Haymon.

On March 5, 2010 Rico got a 4th round K.O. over veteran Cecilio Santos, on ESPN's Friday Night Fights.

On November 8, 2010 Rico got a 2nd round K.O. over Heriberto Ruiz in North Carolina. Rico then claimed his 19th win in a tough fight against Alejandro Valdez by unanimous decision in Atlantic City, taking his next step towards his dream of becoming world champion.

WBA Super Bantamweight Championship
He fought for Akifumi Shimoda's WBA super bantamweight title at the Boardwalk Hall in Atlantic City, New Jersey, United States on July 9, 2011. He defeated Akifumi Shimoda by KO in the 7th round to win the WBA title.

Professional boxing record

See also
List of super-bantamweight boxing champions

References

External links

1987 births
Living people
American sportspeople of Puerto Rican descent
American male boxers
Boxers from Los Angeles
Super-bantamweight boxers
Featherweight boxers
World super-bantamweight boxing champions
World Boxing Association champions